Zimmerius is a genus of Neotropical birds in the family Tyrannidae.

The genus was erected by the American ornithologist Melvin Alvah Traylor Jr. in 1977 with the golden-faced tyrannulet (Zimmerius chrysops) as the type species. The name Zimmerius was chosen to honour the American ornithologist John Todd Zimmer (1889-1957) who specialised in the classification of Neotropical birds.

Species
The genus contains 15 species:

References

Further reading

 
Bird genera
Taxa named by Melvin Alvah Traylor Jr.
Taxonomy articles created by Polbot